According to the 2021 Canadian census, immigrants in Canada number 8.3 million persons and make up approximately 23 percent of Canada's total population. This represents the eighth-largest immigrant population in the world, while the proportion represents one of the highest ratios for industrialized Western countries.

Following Canada's confederation in 1867, immigration played an integral role in helping develop vast tracts of land. During this era, the Canadian Government would sponsor information campaigns and recruiters to encourage settlement in rural areas; however, this would primarily be only towards those of European and Christian backgrounds, while others—particularly Hindus, Buddhist, Shinto, Sikh, Muslim, and Jewish immigrants—as well as the poor, ill, and disabled, would be less than welcome. Following 1947, in the post-World War II period, Canadian domestic immigration law and policy went through significant changes, most notably with the Immigration Act, 1976, and the current Immigration and Refugee Protection Act (IRPA) from 2002.

The main drivers of population growth are immigration.  driven mainly by economic policy and also family reunification. A record number of 405,000 immigrants were admitted to Canada in 2021, with plans to increase the annual intake of immigrants to 500,000 per year. New immigrants settle mostly in major urban areas in the country, such as Toronto, Montreal and Vancouver. Canada also accepts large numbers of refugees, accounting for over 10 percent of annual global refugee resettlements; it resettled more than 28,000 in 2018.

Statistics and sources of immigration 

Canada receives its immigrant population from almost 200 countries. Statistics Canada projects that immigrants will represent between 29.1% and 34.0% of Canada's population in 2041, compared with 23.0% in 2021, while the Canadian population with at least one foreign born parent (first and second generation persons) could rise to between 49.8% and 54.3%, up from 44.0% in 2021. The number of visible ethno-cultural composition of population will double and make up the minority of the population of cities in Canada.

Economic impact of immigration 

Economic impact of Immigration on Canada is a divisive topic. Two main narratives exist on this matter, one is based on speculation that higher immigration rates increases the size of the economy (GDP), and the other is based on studies that it decreases living standards (GDP per capita) for the resident population. Many sources consider the reason for Canada’s mass immigration is because of “dependency ratio,” in Canada this ratio in total is rising hence the government  wants mass immigration to increase the taxpayer base for Canada to be a total welfare state. Many consider this as a low-wage-low-productivity model of immigration that does not focus on creating wealth, and as a failed approach due to not having systems and settings in place for smoothly transitioning new immigrants into jobs in skill shortage sectors that they were invited to fill, and that can empower them for being highly productive and contributing citizens. Among other factors, a major systemic impediment to this transition is the socioeconomic racialization of new immigrants and its life-course altering impact on their quality of life. A popular narrative that exists for immigration is that mass immigration can provide a solution to an aging population. This narrative has been questioned by some and they state immigration alone "can do little" in addressing the issue. Many critics consider Canada has to systematically re-focus on legislating and promoting pro-family policies, and have to work actively in raising the living standard of Canadians. Critics of mass immigration state that Canada does not have the infrastructure and public services to accommodate immigrants and temporary residents in large numbers. Added to this they observe Canada’s moral responsibility to the welcomed refugees is as bad as its responsibility to the bulging homelessness issue.

History of immigration

Following initial British and French colonization, what is now Canada has seen four major waves (or peaks) of immigration and settlement of non-Aboriginal Peoples take place over a span of nearly two centuries. Canada is currently undergoing its fifth wave.

Periods of low immigration in Canada have also occurred: international movement was very difficult during the world wars, and there was a lack of jobs "pulling" workers to Canada during the Great Depression in Canada. Statistics Canada has tabulated the effect of immigration on population growth in Canada from 1851 to 2001.

First wave, pre-1810 (Not exactly, may be 1815) 

The first significant wave of non-Aboriginal immigration to Canada occurred over almost two centuries with slow, but progressive, French settlement in Quebec and Acadia, along with smaller numbers of American and European entrepreneurs in addition to British military personnel. This wave culminated with the influx of 46–50,000 British Loyalists fleeing the American Revolution, chiefly from the Mid-Atlantic States, mostly into what are now Southern Ontario, the Eastern Townships of Quebec, New Brunswick, and Nova Scotia. 36,000 of these migrants went to the Maritimes, and some would later make their way to Ontario.

Another wave of 30,000 Americans settled in Ontario and the Eastern Townships between the late 1780s and 1812 with promises of land. From forcibly having cleared land in Scotland, several thousands of Gaelic-speaking Scottish Highlanders migrated to Cape Breton, Nova Scotia and parts of Eastern Ontario during this period, marking a new age for Canada and its people.

Second wave (The Great Migration), 1820–50 

The second wave of immigrants, known as the Great Migration of Canada, saw the arrival of at least 800,000 people between 1815 and 1850, 60% of whom were British (English and Scottish), while the remainder was mostly Irish.

The Great Migration encouraged immigrants to settle in Canada after the War of 1812, including British army regulars who had served in that war. In 1815, 80% of the 250,000 English-speaking people in Canada were either American colonists or their descendants. By 1851, the percentage of Americans had dropped to 30%. Worried about another American attempt at invasion—and to counter the French-speaking influence of Quebec—colonial governors of Canada rushed to promote settlement in backcountry areas along newly constructed plank roads within organized land tracts, mostly in Upper Canada (present-day Ontario). Much of the settlements were organized by large companies to promote clearing, and thus farming of land lots.

With this wave, Irish immigration to Canada had increased in small numbers to organize land settlements and, mostly, to work on canals, timber, railroads. Irish immigration would peak from 1846 to 1849 due to the Great Famine of Ireland, which resulted in hundreds of thousands more Irish migrants arriving on Canada's shores, with a portion migrating to the United States, either in the short-term or over the subsequent decades.

This movement of people boosted Canada's population from approximately 500,000 in 1812 to 2.5 million by 1851. The Francophones would make up roughly 300,000 of the population in 1812, increasing to approx. 700,000 by the 1851 census, however, demographically Canada had swung to a majority Anglophone country. Canada's 1851 population by region would look as follows:

 Upper Canada (Ontario): 952,000; 
 Lower Canada (Quebec): 890,000—about a quarter of whom spoke English as a first language; 
 The Maritimes: 550,000.

Canada-US 

The Dominion Lands Act of 1872 copied the American system by offering ownership of 160 acres (65 ha) of land free (with a small registration fee) to any man over the age of 18, or any woman heading a household. They did not need to be citizens but had to live on the plot and improve it.

Also during this period, Canada became a port of entry for many Europeans seeking to gain entry into the United States. Canadian transportation companies advertised Canadian ports as a hassle-free way to enter the US, especially as the States began barring entry to certain ethnicities. Both the US and Canada mitigated this situation in 1894 with the Canadian Agreement which allowed for U.S. immigration officials to inspect ships landing at Canadian ports for immigrants excluded from the US. If found, the transporting companies were responsible for shipping the persons back.

Clifford Sifton, Ottawa's Minister of the Interior (1896–1905), argued that the free western lands were ideal for growing wheat and would attract large numbers of hard-working farmers. He removed obstacles that included control of the lands by companies or organizations that did little to encourage settlement. Land companies, the Hudson's Bay Company, and school lands all accounted for large tracts of excellent property. The railways kept closed even larger tracts because they were reluctant to take legal title to the even-numbered lands they were due, thus blocking the sale of odd-numbered tracts. With the goal of maximizing immigration from Britain, eastern Canada and the US, Sifton broke the legal log jam, and set up aggressive advertising campaigns in the U.S. and Europe, with a host of agents promoting the Canadian West. He would also broker deals with ethnic groups who wanted large tracts for homogeneous settlement.

Third wave, 1890–1920

Canada's third wave of immigration came mostly from continental Europe, and peaked before World War I from 1911 to 1913, with over 400,000 migrants in 1912—many of whom were from Eastern and Southern Europe.

Chinese immigration 
Prior to 1885, restrictions on immigration were imposed mostly in response to large waves of migrants rather than planned policy decisions. Such restrictions, at least as official policy, would not explicitly target any specific group or ethnicity of people until 1885, with the passing of the first Chinese Head Tax legislation by the MacDonald government in response to a growing number of Chinese migrants working on the Canadian Pacific Railway.

Subsequent increases in the head tax in 1900 and 1903 limited Chinese entrants to Canada, and it was followed by 1907 major riots against 'Oriental' people (i.e. Asians) in Vancouver, BC by Asiatic Exclusion League. In 1923, the government passed the Chinese Immigration Act which excluded Chinese people from entering Canada altogether between 1923 and 1947. In recognizing Canada's historical discrimination against Chinese immigrants, an official government apology and compensations were announced on 22 June 2006.

Fourth wave, 1940s–60s 

The fourth wave came from Europe following World War II, and peaked at 282,000 in 1957. With many of these migrants coming from Italy and Portugal, Pier 21 in Halifax, Nova Scotia proved to be an influential port for European immigration. From 1928 until ceasing operations in 1971, the Pier would receive 471,940 Italians, becoming the third-largest ethnic group to immigrate to Canada during that time period.

Immigrants from Britain, however, were still given the highest priority, and 'Canadianization' would become of great importance for new arrivals who lacked a British cultural background. There would be no such effort to attract Francophone immigrants. In regard to economic opportunity, Canada was most attractive to farmers headed to the Prairies, who typically came from Eastern and Central Europe, as immigrants from Britain preferred urban life. As such, the Church of England took up the role of introducing British values to farmers newly arrived in the Prairie provinces, although, in practice, they clung to their traditional religious affiliations. Nonetheless, around the 1960s, Indo-Canadians would establish themselves in Canada's exurban and rural agriculture and become a dominant feature in British Columbia's farming sector, having already primarily been established in the provincial forestry industry since the turn of the 20th century. Hispanic immigrants would follow similar lines, particularly in regions that were linked with strong farming settlements immediately south of the border.

With the economy still expanding, Canadians did not always demonstrate sufficient mobility to fill the hiring needs of some regions, nor to fill some economic niches (particularly “entry-level jobs”). Due to these circumstances, in 1967, the Canadian Government would introduce a points-based system, under which applicants were given preference if they knew either French, English, or both; were non-dependent adults (i.e., not too old to work); already had prospective employment lined up in Canada; had relatives in the country (who could support them if necessary); were interested in settling in the parts of Canada with the greatest need for workers; and were trained or educated in fields that were in demand. The new legislation would prove to be an integral element in attracting large numbers of immigrants from sources that were considered “non-traditional.”

From then on, Canada would start to become a more multi-ethnic country with substantial non-British or non-French European elements. Ukrainian Canadians, for instance, accounted for the largest Ukrainian population outside of the Soviet Union. Also in the 1960s, young American men fled to Canada in order to avoid the U.S. draft for the Vietnam War. Especially large numbers were established in BC's Kootenays, Gulf Islands, and Sunshine Coast, followed by others, including counterculture, back-to-the-land advocates who were more drawn to Canada.

Contemporary immigration, 1970s–present

Immigration in Canada since the 1970s, or the fifth wave, has been mostly from Asia. This was largely influenced in 1976 when the Immigration Act was revised and was maintained as official government policy. The regulations introduced in 1967 consisted of 9 categories: education, occupation, professional skills, age, arranged employment, knowledge of English and/or French, relatives in Canada and “personal characteristics.” To qualify for immigration 50 points out of 100 were necessary in 1967.

On 20 February 1978, Canada and Quebec sign an immigration agreement allowing Quebec decision-making power in independently choosing its immigrants, who would then still have to be approved by Ottawa.

During the Mulroney administration, immigration levels were increased. From the late 1980s, the 'fifth wave' of immigration has since maintained, with slight fluctuations (225,000–275,000 annually). Today, political parties remain cautious in criticizing high levels of immigration, because in the early 1990s, as noted by The Globe and Mail, Canada's Reform Party "was branded 'racist' for suggesting that immigration levels be lowered from 250,000 to 150,000". However, the Coalition Avenir Québec  who were elected in the 2018 Quebec election advocated for a reduction to the number of immigrants, to 40,000.

In 2008, Stephen Harper gave then-parliamentary secretary and Minister of Multiculturalism and Citizenship Jason Kenney, established a mandate to integrate immigrants, while improving relationship between the government to communities to gain votes. In November 2017, Immigration Minister Ahmed Hussen announced that Canada would admit nearly 1 million permanent residents over the following three years, rising from 0.7% to 1% of its population by 2020. This increase was motivated by the economic needs of the country caused by an aging population.

In 2008, Citizenship and Immigration Canada (now Immigration, Refugees and Citizenship Canada (IRCC) ) made changes to immigration policy, such as reducing professional categories for skilled immigration and eliminating caps for immigrants in various categories. Likewise, in 2015, Canada introduced the 'Express Entry' system, providing a streamlined application process for many economic immigrants.

From 2013–2014, most of the Canadian public, as well as the country's major political parties, supported either sustaining or increasing the current level of immigration. A sociological study conducted in 2014 concluded that "Australia and Canada are the most receptive to immigration among western nations." In 2017, an Angus Reid poll indicated that a majority of respondents believed that Canada should accept fewer immigrants and refugees.

According to 2016 Census data via Statistics Canada, over one in five Canadians were born abroad, while 22.3% of the Canadian population belonged to visible minorities, of whom three in ten were born in Canada. Moreover, 21.9% of the Canadian population reported themselves as being or having been a landed immigrant or permanent resident in Canada—close to the 1921 Census record of 22.3%, the highest level Canada has seen since Confederation in 1867.

In 2019, Canada admitted 341,180 permanent residents, compared to 321,055 the previous year. Among those admitted, 58% were economic immigrants and their accompanying immediate families; 27% were family class; 15% were either resettled refugees or protected persons or were in the humanitarian and other category. India, Philippines and China are the top three countries of origin for immigrants moving to Canada. A record number of 405,000 immigrants were admitted to Canada in 2021, surpassing the previous annual record of 400,900 set in 1913. 

In 2022, the Government of Canada stated plans to increase immigration to 500,000 people per year until 2025.

Immigration rate

Since confederation in 1867, the highest annual immigration rate in Canada occurred during the early 20th century, including 1913 (new immigrants accounted for 5.3 percent of the total population), 1912 (5.1 percent), 1911 (4.6 percent), 1907 (4.3 percent) and 1910 (4.1 percent). At this time, immigration from the British Isles increased, supplemented by a rapid increase in immigration flows from continental Europe, especially Germany, Scandinavia, and the Soviet Union. 

In 2001, 250,640 people immigrated to Canada, relative to a total population of 30,007,094 people per the 2001 Census. Since 2001, immigration has ranged between 221,352 and 262,236 immigrants per annum. In 2017, the Liberal government announced Canada will welcome nearly one million immigrants over the next three years. The number of migrants would climb to 310,000 in 2018, up from 300,000 in 2017. That number was projected to rise to 330,000 in 2019, then 340,000 in 2020. Accordingly, between 2017 and 2018, net immigration accounted for 80% of Canada's population increase.

The three main official reasons given for the level of immigration were:

The social component – Canada facilitates family reunification.
The humanitarian component – Relating to refugees.
The economic component – Attracting immigrants who will contribute economically and fill labour market needs.

Canada's level of immigration peaked in 1993 in the last year of the Progressive Conservative government and was maintained by the Liberal Party of Canada. Ambitious targets of an annual 1% per capita immigration rate were hampered by financial constraints. The Liberals committed to raising actual immigration levels further in 2005.

As Canadian political parties have been cautious about criticizing high levels of immigration, immigration levels to Canada (approx. 0.7% per year) are considerably higher per capita than to the United States (approx. 0.3% per year).

Furthermore, much of the immigration to the US is from Latin America and relatively less from Asia, though admitting about twice as many immigrants from Asian countries (e.g. China, India, the Philippines, and Pakistan) as Canada. As such, the Hispanic/Latin American population makes up the largest minority group in the United States, whereas such is true for the Asian population in Canada.

Immigrant population growth is concentrated in or around large cities (particularly Vancouver, Toronto, and Montreal). These cities have experienced increased service demands that accompany strong population growth, causing concern about the capability of the infrastructure to handle influxes in such places. For example, as noted in a Toronto Star article from 14 July 2006, 43% of Canada's immigrants move to the Greater Toronto Area and that, "unless Canada cuts immigrant numbers, our major cities will not be able to maintain their social and physical infrastructures."  Most of the provinces that do not have one of those destination cities have implemented strategies to try to boost their share of immigration. While cities are a popular destination for new immigrants, some small towns have seen an influx of immigration due to economic reasons and local schools districts are working to adjust to the change.

According to Immigration, Refugees and Citizenship Canada, under the Canada–Quebec Accord of 1991, Quebec has sole responsibility for selecting most immigrants destined to the province. However, once immigrants are granted permanent residency or citizenship they are free to move between and reside in any provinces under Section 6 of the Canadian Charter of Rights and Freedoms.

Within cities, immigrants are more likely to settle in areas with better public transit service compared to non-immigrants, and are more likely to use public transit for travelling to work, partly because of costs and barriers to car ownership

Illegal migration 

Estimates of undocumented immigrants in Canada range between 35,000 and 120,000. James Bissett, a former head of the Canadian Immigration Service, has suggested that the lack of any credible refugee screening process, combined with a high likelihood of ignoring any deportation orders, has resulted in tens of thousands of outstanding warrants for the arrest of rejected refugee claimants, with little attempt at enforcement. A 2008 report by the Auditor General Sheila Fraser stated that Canada has lost track of as many as 41,000 illegal immigrants.

In August 2017, the border between Quebec and New York, most notably the former Roxham Road port of entry, saw an influx of up to 500 crossings each day outside of official ports of entry by people seeking asylum in Canada. Entering Canada outside of a port of entry is not an offence under either the Criminal Code or Immigration and Refugee Protection Act, and regulations under the IRPA only require that a person seeking to enter Canada outside a point of entry to "appear without delay" at the nearest port of entry. While entering Canada outside of a port of entry may represent an unlawful act, section 133 of the Immigration and Refugee Protection Act requires that charges related to any offences associated with entering Canada are stayed while an entrant's claim is being processed in accordance with the Convention Relating to the Status of Refugees.

As result, Canada increased border patrol and immigration staffing in the area, reiterating that crossing the border outside ports of entry (referred to as 'irregular migration') had no effect on one's asylum status. It is reported that over 38,000 'irregular migrants' arrived in Canada since early 2017.

For the same reason, both Ontario and Quebec requested the Government of Canada to provide  or more to cover their cost of burden to house and provide services to asylum seekers. Related to asylum seekers, Canada joined 164 countries in signing the UN Global Compact for Migration in 2018. The 2017 government claims it is for following careful measures and to meet international obligations in accommodating irregular migrants.

While it is impossible to determine, it is generally accepted that there are tens of thousands of illegal immigrants living in Canada. There were 2,560 removal orders issued against illegal immigrants in 2018, according to a report by the Immigration and Refugee Board of Canada. Immigration to Canada is freely permitted both temporarily and permanently thanks to a strong immigration system. Yet because it can take a while and be difficult, some people choose to use unlawful measures to remain in the nation.

Settlement workers 

Settlement workers help immigrants into Canada understand their rights and responsibilities and find the programs and services they need to integrate with the new culture and the prospects of a livelihood. They motivate organizations to hire immigrants and support immigration through recruiting new members/ employees. They work with government agencies, school boards, libraries and other community organizations with networks of resources. These working relationships also help to provide families with the tools necessary to manage the changing identities of new immigrant families to Canada. Non-profit organizations such as Mennonite New Life Centre of Toronto were founded as early as 1983 to help with immigrant settlement.

Dual intent migration: International students 

Canada is an education haven for international students desirous to gain a North American education. According to Project Atlas, Canada is the world's fourth most popular destination for foreign students. The government by opening its gates to international students across the country has given an economic boom to the education sector. In 2019 alone, it is estimated that a revenue of $21 billion was gained from tuition alone. In a given year it is estimated that around 600,000 international students reside in the country as temporary residents.

In 2019 it was reported that there is a new trend in exploiting Canadian visa process, where immigrant consultants/lawyers with food franchises, motels, gas stations, and family run businesses collect substantial cash from students and foreign nationals for supporting them with LMIA and in their permanent resident applications. 

Also in 2019, many international student advocacy  protested for receiving permanent residence status at the time of their arrival in Canada and 
commented that "migrant students should have the same rights, and that means full labour rights, the same fees, and permanent resident status from day one and that's just fair for the money they spend in Canada." One of their objectives are to equalize their tuition fees to the subsidized fees of domestic students. In 2020, international student bodies across Canada once more pleaded for the same rights being faced with the COVID-19 pandemic.

Attitudes towards immigration
The vast majority of the Canadian public as well as the major political parties support immigration.

2016 
In October 2016, the Angus Reid Institute partnered with the Canadian Broadcasting Corporation (CBC) to conduct a study of 'Canadian values.' Survey results would indicate that about 68% of those polled said that they wanted minorities to do more to fit into the mainstream. However, the same number also said that they were nonetheless happy with how immigrants have integrated themselves into the community. Moreover, 79% of Canadians believe immigration policy should be based on the country's economic and labour needs, rather than on the needs of foreigners to escape crises in their home countries.

Canada's finance minister Bill Morneau established the Advisory Council on Economic Growth, which called for a gradual increase in permanent immigration to Canada to 450,000 people a year.

In an analysis of the survey, Angus Reid, himself, wrote that Canadians' commitment to multiculturalism is not increasing and that Canadian attitudes have been affected by the wake of North American and European nationalist movements, due to which certain provinces have even begun to develop colourist preferences. Reid also expressed his discomfort in the effect that an increase in illiterate refugees may have on Canadian society. Nonetheless, he found that the majority of newcomers and refugees feel that they are treated fairly and welcomed as a "Canadian."

2017–2018 
According to a 2017 poll, 32% of Canadians—up from 30% in 2016—believed that too many refugees were coming to Canada. The poll also asked respondents about their comfortability with surface-level diversity (e.g. around people of a different race), to which 89% said they were comfortable—a number that dropped from 94% in 2005–06.

In 2018, an Angus Reid poll found that two-thirds  (67%) of Canadians agreed that the situation of illegal immigration to Canada constitutes a "crisis" and that Canada's "ability to handle the situation is at a limit." Among respondents who voted in the 2015 election, 56% of those who voted Liberal and 55% of those who voted NDP agreed that the matter had reached a crisis level—agreed upon with 87% of respondents who voted Conservative in the 2015 election. Six out of ten respondents also told the pollster that Canada is "too generous" towards would-be refugees, a spike of five percentage points since the question was asked the previous year.

2019 
EKOS Research Associates, in a 2019 poll, found that about 40% of Canadians feel that there are too many non-white immigrants coming to the country. EKOS expressed this number as demonstrating an increase from those who opposed immigration in previous years, and as an evidence for resurgence of colonial depictions that can lead to racialization of new non-white immigrants.

In a 2019 poll by Léger Marketing, 63% of respondents wanted limits to be set on immigration, while 37% said immigration should be expanded. The results would show a split along party lines, as Green and Conservative Party supporters favoured a reduction, while Liberal and NDP supporters favoured the opposite. Minister of Immigration, Refugees and Citizenship, Ahmed Hussen felt that the poll results may be indicative of the concerns of some Canadians about housing shortages and the ability of communities to absorb more people.

2020 
In a 2020 poll conducted by Nanos Research Group, 17 percent of respondents said an increase to the number of immigrants accepted into the country (compared to 2019) was acceptable, 36 percent said there should be no change, and 40 percent wanted a reduction. Rima Wilkes, a University of British Columbia professor raised a question about why consultation with First Nations is not made for shaping immigration policies while in almost every aspect there is one when it comes to sharing of unceded land and water resources. Canada Border Services Agency (CBSA) data in 2020 shows that there were 12,122 deportations and out of them 1,657 were administrative removals.

History of citizenship and emigration

Citizenship

The word 'Canadian' as a term of nationality or citizenship was first used under the Immigration Act, 1910, to designate those British subjects who were domiciled in Canada, whereas all other British subjects required permission to land. A separate status of "Canadian national" was created under the Canadian Nationals Act, 1921, which would broaden the definition of 'Canadian' to include such citizen's wife and children (fathered by the citizen) who had not yet landed in Canada. After the passage of the Statute of Westminster in 1931, the monarchy ceased to be an exclusively British institution. Thus, Canadians—as well as all others living among what is known today as the Commonwealth realms—were regarded as subjects of the Crown. However, in legal documents, the term 'British subject' continued to be used, hence 'Canadians' were still, officially, British subjects born or regularly domiciled in Canada.

In 1946, Canada would be the first nation in the then-British Commonwealth to establish its own nationality law, with the enactment of the Canadian Citizenship Act, 1946, taking effect on 1 January 1947. In order to be deemed a Canadian citizen, one generally had to be a British subject on the date that the Act took effect, or had been admitted to Canada as landed immigrants before that date. First Nations people were later included by amendment in 1956. The phrase 'British subject' referred generally to anyone from the United Kingdom, its colonies at the time, or a Commonwealth country. Acquisition and loss of British-subject status before 1947 was determined by British law.

Many of the provisions to acquire or lose Canadian citizenship that existed under the 1946 legislation were repealed, whereby Canadian citizens generally would no longer be subject to involuntary loss of citizenship, barring revocation on the grounds of immigration fraud. On 15 February 1977, Canada removed restrictions on dual citizenship.

Present 
Canada offers Canadian citizenship through naturalization. In 2006, the Canadian government reduced the landing fee per immigrant by 50%.
In June 2017, the implementation of the first of a series of important reforms to the Citizenship Act took effect. These reforms restored many of the previous requirements that were in place for over 3 decades in Canada before they were removed and replaced with more stringent criteria by the former Conservative government in 2015. The most important of these changes include:

 The requirement of permanent residence for 3 out of 5 years during the period immediately prior to filing the application. 
 Removal of a physical presence rule. 
 Persons aged 14 to 54 years must pass a Canadian knowledge test and demonstrate a basic ability in either of English or French, Canada's official languages.
 Revocation of citizenship must follow a more formal and balanced process.

Emigration 

While emigration from Canada to the United States has historically exceeded immigration, there have been short periods in which the reverse was true, such as:

 during the American Revolution, with the migration of Loyalist refugees;
 during the various gold rushes of British Columbia, and the later Klondike Gold Rush, which saw many American prospectors inhabiting B.C. and the Yukon; 
 in the early 20th century, when land settlers moved from the Northern Plains to the Prairies

Canada would also see mass emigration during periods of political turmoil or war, such as the Vietnam War. There are over 1 million Americans living in Canada, and over 1 million Canadians living in the US, with many millions more who are descendants of Canadian immigrants to the US—New England alone is 20–25% of Canadian descent.

Immigration has always been offset by emigration: at times this was of great concerns of governments intent on filling up the country, particularly the western provinces. The United States was overall the primary destination followed by reverse migration. As a result, the population of Canada at Confederation (1867) was 3.75 million, or 10% of the US population, an average that maintained from about 1830 to 1870. This number would drop to 6% by 1900 due to large emigration to the US, despite large-scale immigration to Canada. Emigration to the US was only 370,000 in the 1870s; averaged a million a decade from 1880 to 1910; almost 750,000 from 1911 to 1920 and 1.25 million from 1921 to 1930. They consisted of both native-born Canadians and recent immigrants from various, mostly European nations. Between 1945 and 1965, emigration to the US averaged 40–45,000 annually. It was not until 1960 that the population of Canada reached the 10% mark again, or 18 million.

As of 2017, with over 35 million people, Canada has 10.8% of the population of its southern neighbour. In times of economic difficulty, Canadian governments frequently resorted to deportation and coerced "voluntary" deportation to thin out ranks of unemployed workers. However, by the time of the administration of Mackenzie King, it was realized that this was an improvident short-term solution that would result in future labour shortages (that immigration was initially intended to overcome).

Immigration categories

In current Canadian law, immigrants are distinguished by four categories:
 Family: persons closely related to one or more Canadian residents who live in Canada.
 Economic: skilled workers, caregivers, or business persons.
 Protected person or Refugee: persons who are escaping persecution, torture, and/or cruel and unusual punishment.
 Humanitarian or other: persons accepted as immigrants for humanitarian or compassionate reasons.

In March 2019, the Canadian Government announced its Francophone Immigration Strategy as an initiative to increase immigration outside of Quebec for French-speaking individuals in all admission categories.

In 2010, Canada accepted 280,681 immigrants (permanent and temporary) of which 186,913 (67%) were Economic immigrants; 60,220 (22%) were Family class; 24,696 (9%) were Refugees; and 8,845 (2%) were others through working holidays, internships, and studies. In 2019, with 341,180 admissions, Canada achieved its highest level of permanent resident admissions in recent history.

Economic immigrants
The Economic Immigration Class is the largest source of permanent resident admissions in Canada. In 2019, 196,658 individuals were admitted to Canada under the Economic Class, making up approximately 58% of all admissions that year, and a 5.5% increase from 2018. This represents a record-high number of admissions under this category.

IRCC uses seven sub-categories of economic immigrants, including skilled workers, under the following classes:

 Quebec skilled worker; 
 Federal skilled trades; 
 Federal skilled worker;
 Provincial nominee class; and 
 Canadian experience class: the process is done by submitting an online profile to the Express Entry pool, under one of three federal Canada immigration programs or a provincial immigration program. The highest ranked candidates are then invited to apply for permanent residence.

The business immigration programs that offer permanent admission to Canada include:

 Quebec Immigrant Investor Program (QIIP)
 Quebec Entrepreneur Program;
 Quebec Self-Employed;
 Federal Start-Up Visa program.

Federal Start-Up Visa program 
This program grants Canadian permanent residence to qualified entrepreneurs wishing to establish their start-up business in Canada. Successful candidates must get the support of one or more of the designated organizations: Venture capital funds, Angel investor groups, Business incubators.

Applicants must also supply proof of sufficient settlement funds to apply for the program.
Individuals with a certain net worth can also apply for permanent residence via certain programs. For business owners and investor immigrants who do not fit into the Start-Up business class or Quebec Provincial programs, there is a Federal Owner Operator LMIA pathway that if executed correctly can lead to permanent admission to Canada.

The high-profile Skilled worker principal applicants group comprised 19.8% of all immigration in 2005. Canada has also created a VIP Business Immigration Program which allows immigrants with sufficient business experience or management experience to receive the Permanent Residency in a shorter period than other types of immigration.

As of May 1, 2014, the Federal Skilled Worker Class opened once again accepting 25,000 applicants with intake caps at 1,000 per category. A New Economic Action Plan 2015 took effect in January 2015 in which the skilled worker program will be more of an employer based program. The current list of accepted occupations for 2014 includes many occupations such as senior managers, accountants, physicians and medical professionals, professionals in marketing and advertising, real estate professionals and many more.

A candidate's eligibility for Federal Skilled Worker category is assessed based on six selection factor points and scored on a scale of 100. The current pass mark is 67 points.
Six Selection Factor Points:

 Language skills points
 Education points
 Work experience points
 Age points
 Arranged employment in Canada points
 Adaptability points

The changes in 2015 moved permanent residency in Canada away from the "first come, first served" model, and towards a new structure that took on permanent residents based on Canada's economic need. The system is called "Express Entry". Alberta's Immigrant Nominee Program (AINP), in particular, allows skilled workers, along with their families, to make application for permanent residency, and several large Alberta employers with operations in rural areas actively recruit employees from abroad and support them and their families in seeking permanent residency.

Canada announced a new immigration quota of 1.2 million for 2021-2023, with targets of 401,000 new permanent residents in year 2021, 411,000 in 2022 and 421,000 in 2023.

In an effort to meet the 2021 target, on April 14, 2021 Canada created a new immigration pathway to permanent residency for essential workers and international graduates already in Canada. Temporary workers with at least one year of Canadian work experience in a health-care profession or another pre-approved essential occupation, and  international students who graduated from a Canadian institution in 2017 or later are eligible. The maximum numbers of immigrants under this program are 20,000 temporary workers in health care, 
30,000 temporary workers in other selected essential occupations, and 40,000 international students.

Family class
Both citizens and permanent residents may sponsor family members to immigrate to Canada as permanent residents, under the requirement that the sponsor is able to accept financial responsibility for the individual for a given period of time.

In 2019, 91,311 individuals were admitted under the Family Reunification category, which is a 7.2% increase from 2018 and a record high. Also that year, 80% of parent and grandparent applications were processed within 19 months, an improvement from 72 months in 2017.

Humanitarian and compassionate immigration 
Canada also grants permanent residency based on humanitarian and compassionate grounds on a case-by-case basis, or certain public policy considerations under exceptional circumstances. In 2019, there were 4,681 permanent residents admitted through these streams.

Refugees and protected persons 

Each year, IRCC facilitates the admission of a targeted number of permanent residents under the refugee resettlement category. Under Canadian nationality law, an immigrant can apply for citizenship after living in Canada for 1095 days (3 years) in any five-year period provided that they lived in Canada as a permanent resident for at least two of those years. Opposition parties have advocated for providing one-year free residency permits for refugees as an opportunity to increase their living standards until they are ready to migrate back to their home countries, rather than uprooting them from their heritage and culture in forms of relief.

The CBSA is responsible for administering persons who enter Canada through its designated ports of entry (POE); the Royal Canadian Mounted Police (RCMP) are responsible for those who enter Canada unlawfully, i.e., enter between designated POEs.

A person who is seeking asylum in Canada must be first considered eligible by the Immigration and Refugee Board of Canada (IRB). The IRB classifies eligible refugees into two separate categories:
Convention Refugees: Someone who is outside and unable to return to their home country due to a fear of persecution based on several factors including race, religion, and political opinion. (This is outlined by the United Nations' multilateral treaty, Convention Relating to the Status of Refugees.)
Protected Persons: Claims for asylum under this category are usually made at a point of entry into Canada. Those claiming to be a person in need of protection must be unable to return to their home country safely because they would be subjected to a danger of torture, risk for their life, or risk of cruel and unusual treatment.

Claiming asylum in Canada 
Individuals can make an asylum claim in Canada at a port of entry, at a CBSA inland office or an IRCC inland office. CBSA or IRCC officials will then determine if an individual is eligible to make an asylum claim.

After entry, an interview for eligibility is conducted to deem whether the asylum seeker is allowed or declined admission into Canada. Those who are admitted submit their reasons for admissibility, in writing. The IRB hears their case after 60 days; in favorable terms, the claimants are accepted as refugees. If the claims are not deemed appropriate by the interviewer, the asylum seeker may be deported.

According to the Canadian government, anyone can make a claim for refugee protection once they are physically present in Canada, regardless of how they arrived in the country. This includes those who have entered Canada without proper documentation or who have overstayed their visas. Asylum seekers can make a claim at a port of entry, such as an airport or border crossing, or at an inland office of Immigration, Refugees and Citizenship Canada (IRCC). It is important to note that claiming asylum in Canada can be a complex and lengthy process, and there are many factors that can affect an individual's chances of success. For example, the availability of evidence to support the individual's claim, the individual's ability to communicate effectively in English or French, and the political climate in their home country can all have an impact on the outcome of the asylum claim. 

There are many instances in which claims have been deemed ineligible for referral to the IRB, notably those by migrants who seek entry into Canada through the United States, where the Safe Third Country Agreement (STCA) is applied. The STCA dictates persons seeking asylum must make their claim in the first country in which they arrive—either the US or Canada—unless they qualify for an exception. Therefore, if an asylum seeker were to enter the US (as a non-U.S. citizen), make their way to the Canada–U.S. land border, and then attempt to enter Canada with a claim for asylum, they would be denied entry under the STCA. The Agreement is responsible for limiting refugee eligibility to enter Canada and the rejection of several hundred claims a year since its implementation. The CBSA reported that 6,000–14,000 claims were made before the implementation of the STCA, and dropped to an average of 4,000 claims per year after its implementation.

Asylum claimants have been subjected to "indirect refoulment", a consequence of a persons claim in Canada being refused under the STCA, subjecting them to deportation to the destination in which the person was originally seeking asylum from, due to more conservative immigration and refugee policies in the U.S.

Protected persons 
The IRCC provides support for protected persons and their dependants, whereby protected persons are defined as asylum claimants who are granted protected status by Canada. In 2019, 18,443 individuals obtained permanent residence under the protected persons in Canada and dependents abroad category.

Refugees in detention 
As part of the passing of Bill C-31 in December 2012, asylum seekers arriving at a point of entry on the Canada–United States border have been subject to incarceration and detention. Claimants are subject to detention for failing to provide sufficient identification documents, which is in violation with the United Nations Refugee Convention, to which Canada is a signatory. In 2010–2011, Canada detained 8,838 people, of which 4,151 of them were asylum seekers or rejected refugee claimants. There is a requirement to the maximum time limit spent in detention upon being released, a situation which has been subject to criticism held in contrast to areas in Europe: Ireland (30 days), France (32 days), Spain (40 days), and Italy (60 days).

Refugees programs 
The IRCC funds several programs that provide supports and services to resettled refugees.

The Private Sponsorship of Refugees Program is an initiative whereby refugees may resettle in Canada with support and funding from private or joint government-private sponsorship. Established under Operation Lifeline in 1978, the program has since resettled and provided support for over 200,000 refugees under various initiatives and with fluctuating annual intakes.

Pre-departure services backed by IRCC include Canadian Orientation Abroad training and coverage for certain medical services received prior to arriving in Canada. All resettled refugees in Canada receive temporary health care coverage; the IRCC, along with civil-society and sponsorship organizations, also provide:

 income support
 immediate and essential supports and services upon arrival (e.g., housing)
 assistance in securing housing
 settlement services, including language training
 Other refugee-support programs

Asylum statistics 
Individuals can make an asylum claim in Canada at a port of entry, at a CBSA inland office or an IRCC inland office. CBSA or IRCC officials will then determine if an individual is eligible to make an asylum claim.

Francophone Immigration Strategy 
In March 2019, the Canadian Government announced its Francophone Immigration Strategy purposed to achieve a target of 4.4% of French-speaking immigrants of all admissions, outside of Quebec, by 2023.

The strategy's Welcoming Francophone Communities Initiative provides $12.6 million to 14 selected communities (2020 to 2023) for projects to support and welcome French-speaking newcomers. In 2019, IRCC's Settlement Program launched new official-language training services for French-speaking newcomers who settle in Francophone communities outside of Quebec. Seven organizations were selected to receive up to $7.6 million over 4 years.

Accommodations

Disabilities 
In 2011 and 2012, several families were denied immigration to Canada because members of their family have an autism spectrum diagnosis and Citizenship and Immigration Canada (now IRCC) felt the potential cost of care for those family members would place an excessive demand on health or social services. People with autism disorders can be accepted if they are able to depend on themselves. According to the Canadian Human Rights Act, discrimination based on disability is prohibited in all areas of society, including housing. Therefore, it is essential for the accommodation industry in Canada to provide accessible accommodations for disabled people. There are various types of accommodations available in Canada for disabled people, including hotels, motels, bed and breakfasts, resorts, and other types of lodging. The housing and support services for individuals with disabilities are the focus of several non-profit organizations in Canada. The Canadian Association for Community Living (CACL) is one such group that promotes the rights of those with disabilities and offers housing and other services to both individuals and families. Several housing initiatives, including group homes and supportive housing, are run by the CACL around the nation.

Job market and education 
The federal government was asked by businesses to expand programs for professional immigrants to get Canadian qualifications in their fields. In response, the Multiculturalism Act of 1988 was passed, and Canadian Council on Learning was created by the federal government to promote best practices in workplace learning. Additionally, the credentials of immigrant workers are assessed through Canadian agencies by the IRCC for immigration. Ideally, this credential equalization assessment reduces the gap between education and suitable jobs. However, strains of discrimination (i.e. statistical discrimination) lead to a systemic process of rejecting and discouraging immigrants, which is an antithesis for an anti-oppressive culture.

Across Canada, businesses have proposed to allow unpaid or basic-pay internships as part of a rewards system, which were considered illegal (both in government and private) in many provinces at the time, posing as a major obstacle to integrate immigrants into the job market. The lack of policy leadership in this sector has resulted in a "catch-22” situation in which employers want job experience, but potential employees cannot get Canadian experience without first working Canadian jobs/internships. The Ontario Human Rights Commission has acknowledged the racist effects of Canadian work experience requirement for jobs and has declared that Canadian work experience as "prima facie discrimination", and as an inadmissible criterion for exclusion of applicants. However, this has not translated into a nationwide inclusive policy.

Quebec 

In 2017, the Province of Quebec stated that they will prohibit offering or receiving public services for individuals who cover their face, such as those who wear chadors, niqabs or burqas. The reasoning behind the bill was to ensure protection of Quebecois, but the discriminatory strain of the political ideology was reported to be aimed at articles of certain religious faiths. The bill would come under question of in regards to Canadian policy on religious tolerance and accommodation. A qualitative study found that taste-based discrimination is more prevalent in cities than semi-urban areas, as major factors that contribute to less hostility seem to be regional differences in industrial composition and attendant labour demand. There have been demands for the province to charge additional fees from immigrants before landing in Quebec. Quebecois have also urged the province to impose French language training in order for newcomers to become better integrated with the language and culture of their communities. As a result the government initiated a subsidized linguistic integration program in 2019.

Recently, the province saw a 20% gap in earnings between immigrants and Canadian-born individuals in Quebec, largely due to the discrepancy between their respective literacy rates. In 2008, the Canadian Council on Learning reported that almost half of Canadian adults fall below the internationally-accepted literacy standard for coping in a modern society.

In late 2019, under Coalition Avenir Québec (CAQ) government they introduced a Quebec values test where immigrants would have to pass.

During the 2022 Quebec general election, the Coalition Avenir Québec (CAQ) government of François Legault which increased it majority ran on getting more immigration powers from Canada to the Province of Quebec. Legault has raised the idea of even having referendum on immigration powers.  

After their election win they repeated their pledge for Quebec getting more immigration powers.

See also

Canada immigration statistics
Visa policy of Canada
Canada (Citizenship and Immigration) v. Khosa
History of Chinese immigration to Canada
National Advancement Party of Canada
 Ministry of Immigration, Diversity and Inclusion — government of Quebec's immigration department
 Top 25 Canadian Immigrants Award
 Immigrant benefits urban legend — a hoax regarding benefits comparison

Notes

References

Further reading

History
 Adelman, Howard; Borowski, Allan; Burstein, Meyer; and Foster, Lois, eds. Immigration and Refugee Policy: Australia and Canada Compared (1996)
 Avery, Donald H. Reluctant Host: Canada's Response to Immigrant Workers, 1896–1994 (1996)
 
 
 
 
 
  a standard scholarly history
 
 McLean, Lorna "'To Become Part of Us': Ethnicity, Race, Literacy and the Canadian Immigration Act of 1919", Canadian Ethnic Studies, 36#2 (2004): pp. 1–28.

Guides

Other
Can Canada Handle a Polite, Rational and Fact-Based debate on immigration?, Herbert Grubel
David Suzuki's statements on immigration to Canada
Marsden, Lorna. "Population Issues in the Immigration Debate." Canadian Ethnic Studies= Etudes Ethniques au Canada 7.1 (1975): 22.

External links
 History of Canadian immigration at Marianopolis College
 Library and Archives Canada
 Going to Canada – Immigration Portal: A source of free and useful information for newcomers and prospective immigrants to Canada.

 
Demographics of Canada